"Life Is a Lemon and I Want My Money Back" is a radio single by Meat Loaf released in October 1993. It was the second single from the album Bat Out of Hell II: Back into Hell and charted on the US Billboard Album Rock Tracks chart at number 17.

Track listing
 "Life Is a Lemon and I Want My Money Back" (7:59)
 "Good Girls Go to Heaven (Bad Girls Go Everywhere)" (6:50)

Charts

Meat Loaf songs
1994 singles
Songs written by Jim Steinman
Song recordings produced by Jim Steinman
1993 songs
Virgin Records singles
Song recordings with Wall of Sound arrangements